E-mu Systems was a software synthesizer, audio interface, MIDI interface, and MIDI keyboard manufacturer. Founded in 1971 as a synthesizer maker, E-mu was a pioneer in samplers, sample-based drum machines and low-cost digital sampling music workstations.

After its acquisition in 1993, E-mu Systems was a wholly owned subsidiary of Creative Technology, Ltd.
In 1998, E-mu was combined with Ensoniq, another synthesizer and sampler manufacturer previously acquired by Creative Technology.
E-mu was last based in Scotts Valley, California, on the outskirts of Silicon Valley.

History

E-mu Systems was founded in Santa Cruz, CA by Dave Rossum, a UCSC student and two of his friends from Caltech, Steve Gabriel and Jim Ketcham, with the goal to build their own modular synthesizers. Scott Wedge, who would ultimately become president, joined later that summer. In 1972, E-mu became a company, developing and patenting a digitally scanned polyphonic keyboard (1973), licensed for use by Oberheim Electronics in the 4-Voice and 8-Voice synthesizers and by Dave Smith in the Sequential Circuits Prophet-5. E-mu, along with Solid State Micro Technology (SSM), also developed several synthesizer module IC chips, that were used by both E-mu and many other synthesizer companies.

With the financial benefit of the royalties that came from working with these other synthesizer manufacturers, E-mu designed the Audity, their first non-modular synthesizer, showing it at the 1980 AES Convention.  With a price of $69,200 (over $200,000 in 2009 terms when adjusted for inflation), only one machine was ever produced.  At that same convention, Wedge and Rossum saw the Fairlight CMI and the Linn LM-1. Recognizing the trend of digital samplers, they realized that E-mu had the technology to bring a lower-priced sampler to market.  The Emulator debuted in 1981 at a list price of $7,900, significantly less than the $30,000 Fairlight. Following the Emulator, E-mu released the first programmable drum machine with samples built-in priced below $1,000, the E-mu Drumulator. The Drumulator's success was followed by the Emulator II and III, the SP-12 drum sampler, and the Emax series of samplers.

In 1990, E-mu introduced the Proteus, a rackmount sound module, containing pre-recorded samples in ROM. At its introduction, the Proteus had a relatively large library of high-quality samples priced much lower than the competition. The success of the Proteus spurred the development of several additional versions, including the Proteus XR, an orchestral version, and a world music version. In 1987, E-mu's SP-1200 drum sampler offered an "all-in-one" box for sequencing not only drum sounds, but looping samples, and it quickly became the instrument of choice for hip hop producers.

In 1993, E-mu was acquired by Creative Technology (the Singaporean parent company of Creative Labs) and began working on PC soundcard synthesis. Creative Wave Blaster II and Sound Blaster AWE32 used EMU8000 effect processor. Throughout the 1990s, E-mu made many different sound modules along the lines of the Proteus series. E-mu also made unsuccessful attempts at breaking into the digital multitrack recorder with the Darwin hard-disk recording system. In 1998, E-mu was combined with Ensoniq, another synthesizer and sampler manufacturer previously acquired by Creative Technology.

In 2001 E-mu's sound modules were repackaged in the form of a line of tabletop units, the XL7 and MP7 Command Stations, each featuring 128-voice polyphony, advanced synthesis features, and a versatile multitrack sequencer.  A complementary line of keyboard synthesizers was also released using the same technology.

Subsequent products from E-mu were exclusively in software form. In 2004 E-mu released the Emulator X, a PC-based version of its hardware samplers with extended synthesis capabilities. While a PCI card is used for audio input and output, the algorithms no longer run on dedicated hardware but in software on the PC. Proteus X, a software-based sample player, was released in 2005.

Non-Creative sound cards

During 2003-2007, E-mu designed and published a series of high-fidelity "Digital Audio Systems" (computer sound cards), intended for professional, semi-professional and computer audio enthusiast use. They were released under the name E-MU, however bearing a "Creative Professional" label. The card names are number-coded for the number of physical inputs and outputs: 0404, 1212m, 1616, 1616m, 1820 and 1820m, where 1616 is a CardBus version and the rest for PCI, while "m" denotes extra high-quality analogue outputs and inputs. The 1820m was touted as the series' flagship product until the 1616 and 1616M were released (A PCI version of the 1616/M later followed). All of the cards had drivers for Microsoft Windows 2000 and later versions that were current at time of the respective products' release.  (32- and 64-bit).  Only a beta version driver was released for Windows 7. Apple Macintosh support appeared to be pending, but may have been affected by Apple's migration towards Intel.

While the core DSP chip (EMU10K2) of the cards is the same one designed by E-MU and used in Creative's Sound Blaster Audigy2 cards (and hence capable of 24-bit 192 kHz PCM sound), official press releases for the E-MU sound cards have emphasized Creative's lack of input on the design, and the in-house development of the cards and drivers — that is, they wanted to distinguish their "own" series from Creative's signature Sound Blasters. Notably, the cards and drivers entirely omit internal 'wavetable' sample-based MIDI synthesis, Creative's proprietary EAX sound routines and basically anything commonly associated with the parent company. Although the cards were rushed into market and originally came bundled with fairly raw drivers (which have subsequently received periodical major improvements and even additions beyond the advertised specifications), they have generally met with rather favourable reviews.

Timeline of major products 

 1973 - E-mu Modular System
 1980 - Audity
 1981 - Emulator
 1983 - Drumulator
 1984 - Emulator II
 1985 - E-mu SP-12
 1986 - Emax
 1987 - Emulator III
 1987 - E-mu SP-1200
 1990 - Proteus 1 Pop/Rock
 1990 - Proteus 2 Orchestral
 1991 - Proteus 3 World
 1991 - Pro/Cussion
 1993 - Morpheus
 1994 - Emulator IV / e 64
 1996 - Orbit 9090
 1997 - Planet Phatt
 1997 - Carnaval
 1997 - Orbit 9090 V2
 1998 - Proteus 2000
 1998 - E-mu APS (Audio Production Studio)
 1999 - E4 Ultra Samplers
 2001 - XL7/MP7 Command Stations
 2003 - PCI Digital Audio Systems
 2004 - Emulator X
 2005 - CardBus Digital Audio Systems
 2006 - Emulator X2
 2006 - Xboard 25, 49, 61
 2006 - E-mu Proteus X
 2007 - Digital Sound Factory licenses and remasters original Proteus and Emulator sound libraries
 2009 - E-mu PIPEline Digital Wireless Transmitter and Receiver System
 2009 - Emulator X3, the final incarnation of E-MU's flagship software sampler
 2010 - longboard 61, shortboard 49 wireless performance keyboards

See also
 Digital Sound Factory (company)
 Sampler
 Polyphony (instrument)
 Oberheim Electronics
 Sequential Circuits

References

Further reading

External links

E-mu Systems
Digital Sound Factory
Interview with Scott Wedge NAMM Oral History Library. January 21, 2007.
Interview with David Rossum NAMM Oral History Library. January 21, 2007.
E-mu Planet Phatt - Sound On Sound review (archive.org)
E-mu Orbit v2 - Sound On Sound review (archive.org)
E-mu Carnaval - Sound On Sound review (archive.org)
E-mu E-Synth - Sound On Sound review (archive.org)

Synthesizer manufacturing companies of the United States
 
Sound cards
Manufacturing companies established in 1971
Creative Technology acquisitions
American companies established in 1971
1971 establishments in California